Zinc metalloproteinase STE24 is a metalloproteinase enzyme associated with laminopathies.

External links